

Events 
 John Bull is chosen as the first professor of music at Gresham College on the recommendation of Elizabeth I

Publications
 Agostino Agazzari – First book of madrigals for six voices (Venice: Angelo Gardano)
 Ippolito Baccusi
 for five voices (Venice: Ricciardo Amadino)
 (3 Masses fit for both living voices and instruments of all types) for eight voices (Venice: Ricciardo Amadino)
 Girolamo Belli – First book of canzonettas for four voices (Ferrara: Vittorio Baldini)
 Giulio Belli –  for eight voices (Venice: Angelo Gardano), a collection of Psalms for Vespers, also includes two Magnificats
 Giovanni Croce
Masses for eight voices (Venice: Giacomo Vincenti)
First book of masses for five voices (Venice: Giacomo Vincenti)
 for eight voices (Venice: Giacomo Vincenti), containing psalms for Terce
 (The seven penitential sonnets) for six voices (Venice: Giacomo Vincenti), settings of the seven penitential psalms in sonnet form, translated by Giovanni Francesco Bembo
 Christoph Demantius – Joel, chapter 2 verse 12 for five voices (Nuremberg: Paul Kauffman)
 Scipione Dentice – Second book of madrigals for five voices (Venice: Angelo Gardano)
 Johannes Eccard
 (Twenty sacred odes by Ludwig Helmbold) (Mühlhausen: Hieronymous Reinhard)
  for six voices (Königsberg: Georg Osterberger), a wedding song
 for eight voices (Königsberg: Georg Osterberger), a wedding song
 for five voices (Königsberg: Georg Osterberger), a wedding song
 for six voices (Königsberg: Georg Osterberger), a wedding song
 Stefano Felis – Fourth book of motets for five, six, and eight voices (Venice: Giacomo Vincenti)
 Jacobus Gallus –  for five, six, and eight voices (Nuremberg: Alexander Philipp Dieterich), published posthumously
 Bartholomäus Gesius –  for five voices (Frankfurt an der Oder: Friedrich Hartmann)
 Carlo Gesualdo – Fourth book of madrigals for five voices (Ferrara: Vittorio Baldini)
 Hans Leo Hassler
 for four, five, six, and eight voices (Augsburg: Valentin Schönigk)
Madrigals for five, six, seven, and eight voices (Augsburg: Valentin Schönigk)
 Luzzasco Luzzaschi – Sixth book of madrigals for five voices (Ferrara: Vittorio Baldini)
 Giovanni de Macque – First book of motets for five, six, and eight voices (Rome: Nicolo Mutii)
 Tiburtio Massaino – Second book of motets for six voices (Venice: Ricciardo Amadino)
 Johannes Matelart –  for four and five voices (Rome: Nicolo Mutii)
 Philippe de Monte – First book of motets for four voices (Venice: Angelo Gardano)
 Peter Philips – First book of madrigals for six voices (Antwerp: Pierre Phalèse)
 Orfeo Vecchi –  (Complete psalms for all the solemnities of the year) (Milan: heirs of Francesco and Simon Tini)

Classical music 
Piero Strozzi –

Births 
September 3 – Nicola Amati, Cremonese luthier (died 1684)
September 4 – Constantijn Huygens, Dutch composer and poet (died 1687)

Deaths 
February 29 – Philippe Rogier, composer (born 1561)
May 6 – Giaches de Wert, Flemish composer (born 1535)
December 27 – Pietro Pontio, composer (born 1532)

 
Music
16th century in music
Music by year